Graham Taylor (May 2, 1851 – September 26, 1938) was a Minister, Social Reformer, Chicago Theological Seminary faculty member, Educator and Founder of Chicago Commons Settlement House along with Jane Addams.

References
Graham Taylor at Social Welfare History
The Graham Taylor collection at the Newberry Library

1851 births
1938 deaths
American theologians
American sociologists